Syriac may refer to:

Syriac language, an ancient dialect of Middle Aramaic
Sureth, one of the modern dialects of Syriac spoken in the Nineveh Plains region
 Syriac alphabet
 Syriac (Unicode block)
 Syriac Supplement
 Neo-Aramaic languages also known as Syriac in most native vernaculars
 Syriac Christianity, the churches using Syriac as their liturgical language
 West Syriac Rite, liturgical rite of the Maronite Syriac Church, Syriac Orthodox Church, and the Syriac Catholic Church
 East Syriac Rite, liturgical rite of the Syro Malabar Church, Chaldean Catholic Church, Assyrian Church of the East, and the Ancient Church of the East
 Syriacs, a term for Syriac Christians
Aramean people (Syriacs), an ancient Semitic-speaking people 
Suriyani Malayalam, dialect of Malayalam influenced by Syriac

See also
 
 Syriac Rite (disambiguation)
 Syrian (disambiguation)
 Syria (disambiguation)

Language and nationality disambiguation pages